Austria competed at the 2012 European Athletics Championships held in Helsinki, Finland, between 27 June to 1 July 2012. 9 competitors, 6 men and 3 women, took part in 7 events.

Results

Men

Track

Field

Combined

Women

Track

Field

Sources

Nations at the 2012 European Athletics Championships
2012
European Athletics Championships